The Byzantine Greeks were the Greek-speaking Eastern Romans of Orthodox Christianity throughout Late Antiquity and the Middle Ages. They were the main inhabitants of the lands of the Byzantine Empire (Eastern Roman Empire), of Constantinople and Asia Minor (modern Turkey), the Greek islands, Cyprus, and portions of the southern Balkans, and formed large minorities, or pluralities, in the coastal urban centres of the Levant and northern Egypt. Throughout their history, the Byzantine Greeks self-identified as Romans, but are referred to as "Byzantine Greeks" in modern historiography. Latin speakers identified them simply as Greeks or with the term Romei.

The social structure of the Byzantine Greeks was primarily supported by a rural, agrarian base that consisted of the peasantry, and a small fraction of the poor. These peasants lived within three kinds of settlements: the chorion or village, the agridion or hamlet, and the proasteion or estate. Many civil disturbances that occurred during the time of the Byzantine Empire were attributed to political factions within the Empire rather than to this large popular base. Soldiers among the Byzantine Greeks were at first conscripted amongst the rural peasants and trained on an annual basis. As the Byzantine Empire entered the 11th century, more of the soldiers within the army were either professional men-at-arms or mercenaries.

Until the thirteenth century, education within the Byzantine Greek population was more advanced than in the West, particularly at primary school level, resulting in comparatively high literacy rates. Success came easily to Byzantine Greek merchants, who enjoyed a very strong position in international trade. Despite the challenges posed by rival Italian merchants, they held their own throughout the latter half of the Byzantine Empire's existence. The clergy also held a special place, not only having more freedom than their Western counterparts, but also maintaining a patriarch in Constantinople who was considered the equivalent of the pope. This position of strength had built up over time, for at the beginning of the Byzantine Empire, under Emperor Constantine the Great, only a small part, about 10%, of the population was Christian.

Use of the Greek language was already widespread in the eastern parts of the Roman empire when Constantine moved its capital to Constantinople, although Latin was the language of the imperial administration. From the reign of Emperor Heraclius, Greek was the predominant language amongst the populace and also replaced Latin in administration. At first, the Byzantine Empire had a multi-ethnic character, but following the loss of the non-Greek speaking provinces with the 7th century Muslim conquests it came to be dominated by the Byzantine Greeks, who inhabited the heartland of the later empire: modern Cyprus, Greece, Turkey, and Sicily, and portions of southern Bulgaria, Crimea, and Albania. Over time, the relationship between them and the West, particularly with Latin Europe, deteriorated.

Relations were further damaged by a schism between the Catholic West and Orthodox East that led to the Byzantine Greeks being labeled as heretics in the West. Throughout the later centuries of the Byzantine Empire and particularly following the imperial coronation of the King of the Franks, Charlemagne, in Rome in 800, the Byzantines were not considered by Western Europeans as heirs of the Roman Empire, but rather as part of an Eastern Greek kingdom.

As the Byzantine Empire declined, the Roman identity survived until its fall in 1453 and beyond. The Ottomans used the designation "Rûm" ("Roman") distinctly for the Ottoman Greeks and the term "Rum millet" ("Roman nation") for all the Eastern Orthodox populations. It was kept by both Ottoman Greeks and their Ottoman overlords throughout the years of the Ottoman rule, increasingly transforming into an ethnic identity, marked by Greek language and adherence to Orthodox Christianity, a precursor that shaped the modern Greek ethnic identity. The self-identity as Roman among the Greeks only began to lose ground by the time of the Greek Revolution, when multiple factors saw the name 'Hellene' rise to replace it, given the prior revival as self-identification from the 13th century onward by the Nicaenean elite and in the intellectual circles by Georgios Gemistos Plethon and John Argyropoulos, that sowed the seed for it. Today, the modern Greek people still sometimes use, in addition to the terms "Greeks" and "Hellenes", the Byzantine term "Romaioi," or "Romioi," ("Romans") to refer to themselves, as well as the term "Romaic" ("Roman") to refer to their Modern Greek language.

Terminology

During most of the Middle Ages, the Byzantine Greeks self-identified as Rhōmaîoi ("Romans", meaning citizens of the Roman Empire), a term which in the Greek language had become synonymous with Christian Greeks. The Latinizing term Graikoí (Γραικοί, "Greeks") was also used, though its use was less common, and nonexistent in official Byzantine political correspondence, prior to the Fourth Crusade of 1204. While this Latin term for the ancient Hellenes could be used neutrally, its use by Westerners from the 9th century onwards in order to challenge Byzantine claims to ancient Roman heritage rendered it a derogatory exonym for the Byzantines who barely used it, mostly in contexts relating to the West, such as texts relating to the Council of Florence, to present the Western viewpoint. The ancient name Hellenes was synonymous to "pagan" in popular use, but was revived as an ethnonym in the Middle Byzantine period (11th century).

While in the West the term "Roman" acquired a new meaning in connection with the Catholic Church and the Bishop of Rome, the Greek form "Romaioi" remained attached to the Greeks of the Eastern Roman Empire. The term "Byzantine Greeks" is an exonym applied by later historians like Hieronymus Wolf; "Byzantine" citizens continued to call themselves Romaioi (Romans) in their language. Despite the shift in terminology in the West, the Byzantines Empire's eastern neighbors, such as the Arabs, continued to refer to the Byzantines as "Romans", as for instance in the 30th Surah of the Quran (Ar-Rum). The signifier "Roman" (Rum millet, "Roman nation") was also used by the Byzantines' later Ottoman rivals, and its Turkish equivalent Rûm, "Roman", continues to be used officially by the government of Turkey to denote the Greek Orthodox natives (Rumlar) of Istanbul, as well as the Ecumenical Patriarchate of Constantinople ("Roman Orthodox Patriarchate").

Among Slavic populations of southeast Europe, such as Bulgarians and Serbs the name "Rhomaioi" (Romans) in their languages was most commonly translated as "Greki" (Greeks). Some Slavonic texts during the early medieval era also used the terms Rimljani or Romei. In medieval Bulgarian sources the Byzantine Emperors were the "Tsars of the Greeks" and the Byzantine Empire was known as "Tsardom of the Greeks". Both rulers of the Despotate of Epirus and the Empire of Nicaea were also "Greek tsars ruling over Greek people".

Equally, among the Nordic people such as the Icelanders, Varangians (Vikings) and other Scandinavian people, the "Rhomaioi" (Romans) were called "Grikkr" (Greeks). There are various runic inscriptions left in Norway, Sweden and even in Athens by travellers and members of the Varangian Guard like the Greece runestones and the Piraeus Lion which we meet the terms Grikkland (Greece) and Grikkr referring to their ventures in Byzantine Empire and their interaction with the Byzantines.

Society
While social mobility was not unknown in Byzantium the order of society was thought of as more enduring, with the average man regarding the court of Heaven to be the archetype of the imperial court in Constantinople. This society included various classes of people that were neither exclusive nor immutable. The most characteristic were the poor, the peasants, the soldiers, the teachers, entrepreneurs, and clergy.

The poor
According to a text dated to AD 533, a man was termed "poor" if he did not have 50 gold coins (aurei), which was a modest though not negligible sum. The Byzantines were heirs to the Greek concepts of charity for the sake of the polis; nevertheless it was the Christian concepts attested in the Bible that animated their giving habits, and specifically the examples of Basil of Caesarea (who is the Greek equivalent of Santa Claus), Gregory of Nyssa, and John Chrysostom. The number of the poor fluctuated in the many centuries of Byzantium's existence, but they provided a constant supply of muscle power for the building projects and rural work. Their numbers apparently increased in the late fourth and early fifth centuries as barbarian raids and a desire to avoid taxation pushed rural populations into cities.

Since Homeric times, there were several categories of poverty: the ptochos ("passive poor") was lower than the penes ("active poor"). They formed the majority of the infamous Constantinopolitan mob whose function was similar to the mob of the First Rome. However, while there are instances of riots attributed to the poor, the majority of civil disturbances were specifically attributable to the various factions of the Hippodrome like the Greens and Blues. The poor made up a non-negligible percentage of the population, but they influenced the Christian society of Byzantium to create a large network of hospitals (iatreia) and almshouses, and a religious and social model largely justified by the existence of the poor and born out of the Christian transformation of classical society.

Peasantry
Byzantine state and society relied on the Hellenistic system of joint tax liability due to the easy handling, fast and simple revenue for the state from the different towns and villages chorio, komai mostly made up of peasants, who were the main income. There are no reliable figures as to the numbers of the peasantry, yet it is widely assumed that the vast majority of Byzantine Greeks lived in rural and agrarian areas. In the Taktika of Emperor Leo VI the Wise (r. 886–912), the two professions defined as the backbone of the state are the peasantry (geōrgikē, "farmers") and the soldiers (stratiōtikē).

Peasants lived mostly in villages, whose name changed slowly from the classical kome to the modern chorio. While agriculture and herding were the dominant occupations of villagers they were not the only ones. There are records for the small town of Lampsakos, situated on the eastern shore of the Hellespont, which out of 173 households classifies 113 as peasant and 60 as urban, which indicate other kinds of ancillary activities.

The Treatise on Taxation, preserved in the Biblioteca Marciana in Venice, distinguishes between three types of rural settlements, the chorion (Greek: χωρίον) or village, the agridion (Greek: αγρίδιον) or hamlet, and the proasteion (Greek: προάστειον) or estate. According to a 14th-century survey of the village of Aphetos, donated to the monastery of Chilandar, the average size of a landholding is only 3.5 modioi (0.08 ha). Taxes placed on rural populations included the kapnikon (Greek: καπνικόν) or hearth tax, the synone (Greek: συνονή) or cash payment frequently affiliated with the kapnikon, the ennomion (Greek: εννόμιον) or pasture tax, and the aerikon (Greek: αέρικον, meaning "of the air") which depended on the village's population and ranged between 4 and 20 gold coins annually.

Their diet consisted of mainly grains and beans and in fishing communities fish was usually substituted for meat. Bread, wine, and olives were important staples of Byzantine diet with soldiers on campaign eating double-baked and dried bread called paximadion (Greek: παξιμάδιον). As in antiquity and modern times, the most common cultivations in the choraphia (Greek: χωράφια) were olive groves and vineyards. While Liutprand of Cremona, a visitor from Italy, found Greek wine irritating as it was often flavoured with resin (retsina) most other Westerners admired Greek wines, Cretan in particular being famous.

While both hunting and fishing were common, the peasants mostly hunted to protect their herds and crops. Apiculture, the keeping of bees, was as highly developed in Byzantium as it had been in Ancient Greece. Aside from agriculture, the peasants also laboured in the crafts, fiscal inventories mentioning smiths (Greek: χαλκεύς, chalkeus), tailors (Greek: ράπτης, rhaptes), and cobblers (Greek: τζαγγάριος, tzangarios).

Soldiers

During the Byzantine millennium, hardly a year passed without a military campaign. Soldiers were a normal part of everyday life, much more so than in modern Western societies. While it is difficult to draw a distinction between Roman and Byzantine soldiers from an organizational aspect, it is easier to do so in terms of their social profile. The military handbooks known as the Taktika continued a Hellenistic and Roman tradition, and contain a wealth of information about the appearance, customs, habits, and life of the soldiers.

As with the peasantry, many soldiers performed ancillary activities, like medics and technicians. Selection for military duty was annual with yearly call-ups and great stock was placed on military exercises, during the winter months, which formed a large part of a soldier's life.

Until the 11th century, the majority of the conscripts were from rural areas, while the conscription of craftsmen and merchants is still an open question. From then on, professional recruiting replaced conscription, and the increasing use of mercenaries in the army was ruinous for the treasury. From the 10th century onwards, there were laws connecting land ownership and military service. While the state never allotted land for obligatory service, soldiers could and did use their pay to buy landed estates, and taxes would be decreased or waived in some cases. What the state did allocate to soldiers, however, from the 12th century onwards, were the tax revenues from some estates called pronoiai. As in antiquity, the basic food of the soldier remained the dried biscuit bread, though its name had changed from boukelaton to paximadion.

Teachers

Byzantine education was the product of an ancient Greek educational tradition that stretched back to the 5th century BC. It comprised a tripartite system of education that, taking shape during the Hellenistic era, was maintained, with inevitable changes, up until the fall of Constantinople. The stages of education were the elementary school, where pupils ranged from six to ten years, secondary school, where pupils ranged from ten to sixteen, and higher education.

Elementary education was widely available throughout most of the Byzantine Empire's existence, in towns and occasionally in the countryside. This, in turn, ensured that literacy was much more widespread than in Western Europe, at least until the twelfth century. Secondary education was confined to the larger cities while higher education was the exclusive provenance of Constantinople.

Though not a society of mass literacy like modern societies, Byzantine society was a profoundly literate one. Based on information from an extensive array of Byzantine documents from different periods (i.e. homilies, Ecloga, etc.), Robert Browning concluded that, while books were luxury items and functional literacy (reading and writing) was widespread, but largely confined to cities and monasteries, access to elementary education was provided in most cities for much of the time and sometimes in villages. Nikolaos Oikonomides, focusing on 13th-century Byzantine literacy in Western Asia Minor, states that Byzantine society had "a completely literate church, an almost completely literate aristocracy, some literate horsemen, rare literate peasants and almost completely illiterate women." Ioannis Stouraitis estimates that the percentage of the Empire's population with some degree of literacy was at most 15–20% based primarily on the mention of illiterate Byzantine tourmarchai in the Tactica of Emperor Leo VI the Wise (r. 886–912).

In Byzantium, the elementary school teacher occupied a low social position and taught mainly from simple fairy tale books (Aesop's Fables were often used). However, the grammarian and rhetorician, teachers responsible for the following two phases of education, were more respected. These used classical Greek texts like Homer's Iliad or Odyssey and much of their time was taken with detailed word-for-word explication. Books were rare and very expensive and likely only possessed by teachers who dictated passages to students.

Women

Women have tended to be overlooked in Byzantine studies as Byzantine society left few records about them. Women were disadvantaged in some aspects of their legal status and in their access to education, and limited in their freedom of movement. The life of a Byzantine Greek woman could be divided into three phases: girlhood, motherhood, and widowhood.

Childhood was brief and perilous, even more so for girls than boys. Parents would celebrate the birth of a boy twice as much and there is some evidence of female infanticide (i.e. roadside abandonment and suffocation), though it was contrary to both civil and canon law. Educational opportunities for girls were few: they did not attend regular schools but were taught in groups at home by tutors. With few exceptions, education was limited to literacy and the Bible; a famous exception is the princess Anna Komnene (1083–1153), whose Alexiad displays a great depth of erudition, and the renowned 9th century Byzantine poet and composer Kassiani. The majority of a young girl's daily life would be spent in household and agrarian chores, preparing herself for marriage.

For most girls, childhood came to an end with the onset of puberty, which was followed shortly after by betrothal and marriage. Although marriage arranged by the family was the norm, romantic love was not unknown. Most women bore many children but few survived infancy, and grief for the loss of a loved one was an inalienable part of life. The main form of birth control was abstinence, and while there is evidence of contraception it seems to have been mainly used by prostitutes.

Due to prevailing norms of modesty, women would wear clothing that covered the whole of their body except their hands. While women among the poor sometimes wore sleeveless tunics, most women were obliged to cover even their hair with the long maphorion veil. Women of means, however, spared no expense in adorning their clothes with exquisite jewelry and fine silk fabrics. Divorces were hard to obtain even though there were laws permitting them. Husbands would often beat their wives, though the reverse was not unknown, as in Theodore Prodromos's description of a battered husband in the Ptochoprodromos poems.

Although female life expectancy in Byzantium was lower than that of men, due to death in childbirth, wars and the fact that men married younger, female widowhood was still fairly common. Still, some women were able to circumvent societal strictures and work as traders, artisans, abbots, entertainers, and scholars.

Entrepreneurs

The traditional image of Byzantine Greek merchants as unenterprising benefactors of state aid is beginning to change for that of mobile, pro-active agents. The merchant class, particularly that of Constantinople, became a force of its own that could, at times, even threaten the Emperor as it did in the eleventh and twelfth centuries. This was achieved through efficient use of credit and other monetary innovations. Merchants invested surplus funds in financial products called chreokoinonia, the equivalent and perhaps ancestor of the later Italian commenda.

Eventually, the purchasing power of Byzantine merchants became such that it could influence prices in markets as far afield as Cairo and Alexandria. In reflection of their success, emperors gave merchants the right to become members of the Senate, that is to integrate themselves with the ruling elite. This had an end by the end of the eleventh century when political machinations allowed the landed aristocracy to secure the throne for a century and more. Following that phase, however, the enterprising merchants bounced back and wielded real clout during the time of the Third Crusade.

The reason Byzantine Greek merchants have often been neglected in historiography is not that they were any less able than their ancient or modern Greek colleagues in matters of trade. It rather originated with the way history was written in Byzantium, which was often under the patronage of their competitors, the court, and land aristocracy. The fact that they were eventually surpassed by their Italian rivals is attributable to the privileges sought and acquired by the Crusader States within the Levant and the dominant maritime violence of the Italians.

Clergy
Unlike in Western Europe where priests were clearly demarcated from the laymen, the clergy of the Eastern Roman Empire remained in close contact with the rest of society. Readers and subdeacons were drawn from the laity and expected to be at least twenty years of age while priests and bishops had to be at least 30. Unlike the Latin church, the Byzantine church allowed married priests and deacons, as long as they were married before ordination. Bishops, however, were required to be unmarried.

While the religious hierarchy mirrored the Empire's administrative divisions, the clergy were more ubiquitous than the emperor's servants. The issue of caesaropapism, while usually associated with the Byzantine Empire, is now understood to be an oversimplification of actual conditions in the Empire. By the fifth century, the Patriarch of Constantinople was recognized as first among equals of the four eastern Patriarchs and as of equal status with the Pope in Rome.

The ecclesiastical provinces were called eparchies and were headed by archbishops or metropolitans who supervised their subordinate bishops or episkopoi. For most people, however, it was their parish priest or papas (from the Greek word for "father") that was the most recognizable face of the clergy.

Culture

Language

The Eastern Roman Empire was in language and civilization a Greek society. Linguistically, Byzantine or medieval Greek is situated between the Hellenistic (Koine) and modern phases of the language. Since as early as the Hellenistic era, Greek had been the lingua franca of the educated elites of the Eastern Mediterranean, spoken natively in the southern Balkans, the Greek islands, Asia Minor, and the ancient and Hellenistic Greek colonies of Southern Italy, the Black Sea, Western Asia and North Africa. At the beginning of the Byzantine millennium, the koine (Greek: κοινή) remained the basis for spoken Greek and Christian writings, while Attic Greek was the language of the philosophers and orators.

As Christianity became the dominant religion, Attic began to be used in Christian writings in addition to and often interspersed with koine Greek. Nonetheless, from the 6th at least until the 12th century, Attic remained entrenched in the educational system; while further changes to the spoken language can be postulated for the early and middle Byzantine periods.

The population of the Byzantine Empire, at least in its early stages, had a variety of mother tongues including Greek. These included Latin, Aramaic, Coptic, and Caucasian languages, while Cyril Mango also cites evidence for bilingualism in the south and southeast. These influences, as well as an influx of people of Arabic, Celtic, Germanic, Turkic, and Slavic backgrounds, supplied medieval Greek with many loanwords that have survived in the modern Greek language. From the 11th century onward, there was also a steady rise in the literary use of the vernacular.

Following the Fourth Crusade, there was increased contact with the West; and the lingua franca of commerce became Italian. In the areas of the Crusader kingdoms a classical education (Greek: παιδεία, paideia) ceased to be a sine qua non of social status, leading to the rise of the vernacular. From this era many beautiful works in the vernacular, often written by people deeply steeped in classical education, are attested. A famous example is the four Ptochoprodromic poems attributed to Theodoros Prodromos. From the 13th to the 15th centuries, the last centuries of the Empire, there arose several works, including laments, fables, romances, and chronicles, written outside Constantinople, which until then had been the seat of most literature, in an idiom termed by scholars as "Byzantine Koine".

However, the diglossia of the Greek-speaking world, which had already started in ancient Greece, continued under Ottoman rule and persisted in the modern Greek state until 1976, although Koine Greek remains the official language of the Greek Orthodox Church. As shown in the poems of Ptochoprodromos, an early stage of modern Greek had already been shaped by the 12th century and possibly earlier. Vernacular Greek continued to be known as "Romaic" ("Roman") until the 20th century.

Religion

At the time of Constantine the Great (r. 306–337), barely 10% of the Roman Empire's population were Christians, with most of them being urban population and generally found in the eastern part of the Roman Empire. The majority of people still honoured the old gods in the public Roman way of religio. As Christianity became a complete philosophical system, whose theory and apologetics were heavily indebted to the Classic word, this changed. In addition, Constantine, as Pontifex Maximus, was responsible for the correct cultus or veneratio of the deity which was in accordance with former Roman practice. The move from the old religion to the new entailed some elements of continuity as well as break with the past, though the artistic heritage of paganism was literally broken by Christian zeal.

Christianity led to the development of a few phenomena characteristic of Byzantium. Namely, the intimate connection between Church and State, a legacy of Roman cultus. Also, the creation of a Christian philosophy that guided Byzantine Greeks in their everyday lives. And finally, the dichotomy between the Christian ideals of the Bible and classical Greek paideia which could not be left out, however, since so much of Christian scholarship and philosophy depended on it. These shaped Byzantine Greek character and the perceptions of themselves and others.

Christians at the time of Constantine's conversion made up only 10% of the population. This would rise to 50% by the end of the fourth century and 90% by the end of the fifth century. Emperor Justinian I (r. 527–565) then brutally mopped up the rest of the pagans, highly literate academics on one end of the scale and illiterate peasants on the other. A conversion so rapid seems to have been rather the result of expediency than of conviction.

The survival of the Empire in the East assured an active role of the emperor in the affairs of the Church. The Byzantine state inherited from pagan times the administrative and financial routine of organising religious affairs, and this routine was applied to the Christian Church. Following the pattern set by Eusebius of Caesarea, the Byzantines viewed the emperor as a representative or messenger of Christ, responsible particularly for the propagation of Christianity among pagans, and for the "externals" of the religion, such as administration and finances. The imperial role in the affairs of the Church never developed into a fixed, legally defined system, however.

With the decline of Rome, and internal dissension in the other Eastern patriarchates, the church of Constantinople became, between the 6th and 11th centuries, the richest and most influential centre of Christendom. Even when the Byzantine Empire was reduced to only a shadow of its former self, the Church, as an institution, exercised so much influence both inside and outside the imperial frontiers as never before. As George Ostrogorsky points out:

"The Patriarchate of Constantinople remained the center of the Orthodox world, with subordinate metropolitan sees and archbishoprics in the territory of Asia Minor and the Balkans, now lost to Byzantium, as well as in Caucasus, Russia and Lithuania. The Church remained the most stable element in the Byzantine Empire."

In terms of religion, Byzantine Greek Macedonia is also significant as being the home of Saints Cyril and Methodius, two Greek brothers from Thessaloniki (Salonika) who were sent on state-sponsored missions to proselytize among the Slavs of the Balkans and east-central Europe. This involved Cyril and Methodius having to translate the Christian Bible into the Slavs' own language, for which they invented an alphabet that became known as Old Church Slavonic. In the process, this cemented the Greek brothers' status as the pioneers of Slavic literature and those who first introduced Byzantine civilization and Orthodox Christianity to the hitherto illiterate and pagan Slavs.

Identity

Self-perception

In modern Byzantine scholarship, there are currently three main schools of thought on medieval eastern Roman identity. 
 First, a school of thought that developed largely under the influence of modern Greek nationalism, treats Roman identity as the medieval form of a perennial Greek national identity. In this view, as heirs to the ancient Greeks and of the Roman state, the Byzantines thought of themselves as Rhomaioi, or Romans, though they knew that they were ethnically Greeks.
 Second, which could be regarded as preponderant in the field considers "Romanity" the mode of self-identification of the subjects of a multi-ethnic empire at least up to the 12th century, where the average subject identified as Roman. 
 Third, a line of thought argues that the eastern Roman identity was a separate pre-modern national identity. The established consensus in the field of Byzantine studies does not call into question the self-identification of the "Byzantines" as Romans.

The defining traits of being considered one of the Rhomaioi were being an Eastern Orthodox Christian and more importantly speaking Greek, characteristics which had to be acquired by birth if one was not to be considered an allogenes or even a barbarian. The term mostly used to describe someone who was a foreigner to both the Byzantines and their state was ethnikós, a term which originally described non-Jews or non-Christians, but had lost its religious meaning. In a classicizing vein usually applied to other peoples, Byzantine authors regularly referred to their people as "Ausones", an ancient name for the original inhabitants of Italy. Most historians agree that the defining features of their civilization were: 1) Greek language, culture, literature, and science, 2) Roman law and tradition, 3) Christian faith. The Byzantine Greeks were, and perceived themselves as, heirs to the culture of ancient Greece, the political heirs of imperial Rome, and followers of the Apostles. Thus, their sense of "Romanity" was different from that of their contemporaries in the West. "Romaic" was the name of the vulgar Greek language, as opposed to "Hellenic" which was its literary or doctrinal form. Being a Roman was mostly a matter of culture and religion rather than speaking Greek or living within Byzantine territory, and had nothing to do with race. Some Byzantines began to use the name Greek (Hellen) with its ancient meaning of someone living in the territory of Greece rather than its usually Christian meaning of "pagan". Realizing that the restored empire held lands of ancient Greeks and had a population largely descended from them, some scholars such as George Gemistos Plethon and John Argyropoulos put emphasized pagan Greek and Christian Roman past, mostly during a time of Byzantine political decline. However such views were part of a few learned people, and the majority of Byzantine Christians would see them as nonsensical or dangerous. After 1204 the Byzantine successor entities were mostly Greek-speaking but not nation-states like France and England of that time. The risk or reality of foreign rule, not some sort of Greek national consciousness was the primary element that drew contemporary Byzantines together. Byzantine elites and common people nurtured a high self-esteem based on their perceived cultural superiority towards foreigners, whom they viewed with contempt, despite the frequent occurrence of compliments to an individual foreigner as an andreîos Rhōmaióphrōn (roughly "a brave Roman-minded fellow"). There was always an element of indifference or neglect of everything non-Greek, which was therefore "barbarian".

Official discourse
In official discourse, "all inhabitants of the empire were subjects of the emperor, and therefore Romans." Thus the primary definition of Rhōmaios was "political or statist." In order to succeed in being a full-blown and unquestioned "Roman" it was best to be a Greek Orthodox Christian and a Greek-speaker, at least in one's public persona. Yet, the cultural uniformity which the Byzantine church and the state pursued through Orthodoxy and the Greek language was not sufficient to erase distinct identities, nor did it aim to.

Regional identity
Often one's local (geographic) identity could outweigh one's identity as a Rhōmaios. The terms xénos and exōtikós denoted "people foreign to the local population," regardless of whether they were from abroad or from elsewhere within the Byzantine Empire. "When a person was away from home he was a stranger and was often treated with suspicion. A monk from western Asia Minor who joined a monastery in Pontus was 'disparaged and mistreated by everyone as a stranger'. The corollary to regional solidarity was regional hostility."

Revival of Hellenism
From an evolutionary standpoint, Byzantium was a multi-ethnic empire that emerged as a Christian empire, soon comprised the Hellenised empire of the East, and ended its thousand-year history, in 1453, as a Greek Orthodox state: an empire that became a nation, almost by the modern meaning of the word. The presence of a distinctive and historically rich literary culture was also very important in the division between "Greek" East and "Latin" West and thus the formation of both. It was a multi-ethnic empire where the Hellenic element was predominant, especially in the later period.

Spoken language and state, the markers of identity that were to become a fundamental tenet of nineteenth-century nationalism throughout Europe became, by accident, a reality during a formative period of medieval Greek history. After the Empire lost non-Greek speaking territories in the 7th and 8th centuries, "Greek" (Ἕλλην), when not used to signify "pagan", became synonymous with "Roman" and "Christian" (Χριστιανός) to mean a Christian Greek citizen of the Eastern Roman Empire.

In the context of increasing Venetian and Genoese power in the eastern Mediterranean, association with Hellenism took deeper root among the Byzantine elite, on account of a desire to distinguish themselves from the Latin West and to lay legitimate claims to Greek-speaking lands. From the 12th century onwards, Byzantine Roman writers started to disassociate themselves from the Empire's pre-Constantinian Latin past, regarding henceforth the transfer of the Roman capital to Constantinople by Constantine as their founding moment and reappraised the normative value of the pagan Hellenes, even though the latter were still viewed as a group distinct from the Byzantines. The first time the term "Hellene" was used to mean "Byzantine" in official correspondence was in a letter to Emperor Manuel I Komnenus (1118–1180). Beginning in the twelfth century and especially after 1204, certain Byzantine Greek intellectuals began to use the ancient Greek ethnonym Héllēn in order to describe Byzantine civilisation. After the fall of Constantinople to the Crusaders in 1204, a small circle of the elite of the Empire of Nicaea used the term Hellene as a term of self-identification. For example, in a letter to Pope Gregory IX, the Nicaean emperor John III Doukas Vatatzes (r. 1221–1254) claimed to have received the gift of royalty from Constantine the Great, and put emphasis on his "Hellenic" descent, exalting the wisdom of the Greek people. He was presenting Hellenic culture as an integral part of the Byzantine polity in defiance of Latin claims. Emperor Theodore II Laskaris (r. 1254–1258), the only one during this period to systematically employ the term Hellene as a term of self-identification, tried to revive Hellenic tradition by fostering the study of philosophy, for in his opinion there was a danger that philosophy "might abandon the Greeks and seek refuge among the Latins". For historians of the court of Nikaia, however, such as George Akropolites and George Pachymeres, Rhomaios remained the only significant term of self-identification, despite traces of influence of the policy of the Emperors of Nikaia in their writings.

During the Palaiologan dynasty, after the Byzantines recaptured Constantinople, Rhomaioi became again dominant as a term for self-description and there are few traces of Hellene, such as in the writings of George Gemistos Plethon; the neo-platonic philosopher boasted "We are Hellenes by race and culture," and proposed a reborn Byzantine Empire following a utopian Hellenic system of government centered in Mystras. Under the influence of Plethon, John Argyropoulos, addressed Emperor John VIII Palaiologos (r. 1425–1448) as "Sun King of Hellas" and urged the last Byzantine emperor, Constantine XI Palaiologos (r. 1449–1453), to proclaim himself "King of the Hellenes". These largely rhetorical expressions of Hellenic identity were confined in a very small circle and had no impact on the people. They were however continued by Byzantine intellectuals who participated in the Italian Renaissance.

Western perception

In the eyes of the West, after the coronation of Charlemagne, the Byzantines were not acknowledged as the inheritors of the Roman Empire. Byzantium was rather perceived to be a corrupted continuation of ancient Greece, and was often derided as the "Empire of the Greeks" or "Kingdom of Greece". Such denials of Byzantium's Roman heritage and ecumenical rights would instigate the first resentments between Greeks and "Latins" (for the Latin liturgical rite) or "Franks" (for Charlemegne's ethnicity), as they were called by the Greeks.

Popular Western opinion is reflected in the Translatio militiae, whose anonymous Latin author states that the Greeks had lost their courage and their learning, and therefore did not join in the war against the infidels. In another passage, the ancient Greeks are praised for their military skill and their learning, by which means the author draws a contrast with contemporary Byzantine Greeks, who were generally viewed as a non-warlike and schismatic people. While this reputation seems strange to modern eyes given the unceasing military operations of the Byzantines and their eight century struggle against Islam and Islamic states, it reflects the realpolitik sophistication of the Byzantines, who employed diplomacy and trade as well as armed force in foreign policy, and the high-level of their culture in contrast to the zeal of the Crusaders and the ignorance and superstition of the medieval West. As historian Steven Runciman has put it:

"Ever since our rough crusading forefathers first saw Constantinople and met, to their contemptuous disgust, a society where everyone read and wrote, ate food with forks and preferred diplomacy to war, it has been fashionable to pass the Byzantines by with scorn and to use their name as synonymous with decadence".

A turning point in how both sides viewed each other is probably the massacre of Latins in Constantinople in 1182. The massacre followed the deposition of Maria of Antioch, a Norman-Frankish (therefore "Latin") princess who was ruling as regent to her infant son Emperor Alexios II Komnenos. Maria was deeply unpopular due to the heavy-handed favoritism that had been shown the Italian merchants during the regency and popular celebrations of her downfall by the citizenry of Constantinople quickly turned to rioting and massacre. The event and the horrific reports of survivors inflamed religious tensions in the West, leading to the retaliatory sacking of Thessalonica, the empire's second largest city, by William II of Sicily. An example of Western opinion at the time is the writings of William of Tyre, who described the "Greek nation" as "a brood of vipers, like a serpent in the bosom or a mouse in the wardrobe evilly requite their guests".

Eastern perception

In the East, the Persians and Arabs continued to regard the Eastern Roman (Byzantine) Greeks as "Romans" (Arabic: ar-Rūm) after the fall of the Western Roman Empire, for instance, the 30th surah of the Quran (Ar-Rum) refers to the defeat of the Byzantines ("Rum" or "Romans") under Heraclius by the Persians at the Battle of Antioch (613), and promises an eventual Byzantine ("Roman") victory. This traditional designation of the Byzantines as [Eastern] Romans in the Muslim world continued through the Middle Ages, leading to names such as the Sultanate of Rum ("Sultanate over the Romans") in conquered Anatolia and personal names such as Rumi, the mystical Persian poet who lived in formerly Byzantine Konya in the 1200s. Late medieval Arab geographers still saw the Byzantines as Rum (Romans) not as Greeks, for instance Ibn Battuta saw the, then collapsing, Rum as "pale continuators and successors of the ancient Greeks (Yunani) in matters of culture."

The Muslim Ottomans also referred to their Byzantine Greek rivals as Rûm, "Romans", and that term is still in official use in Turkey for the Greek-speaking natives (Rumlar) of Istanbul cf. Ecumenical Patriarchate of Constantinople ("Roman Orthodox Patriarchate"). Many place-names in Anatolia derive from this Turkish word (Rûm, "Romans") for the Byzantines: Erzurum ("Arzan of the Romans"), Rumelia ("Land of the Romans"), and Rumiye-i Suğra ("Little Rome", the region of Amasya and Sivas).

Post-Byzantine history

Forming the majority of the Byzantine Empire proper at the height of its power, the Byzantine Greeks gradually came under the dominance of foreign powers with the decline of the Empire during the Middle Ages. The majority of Byzantine Greeks lived in the Ionian islands, the southern Balkans, and Aegean islands, Crete and Asia Minor. Following the end of the Byzantine Empire in 1453, there were many migration waves of Byzantine Greek scholars and emigres to the west, which is considered by many scholars key to the revival of Greek studies that led to the development of the Renaissance humanism and science. These emigres brought to Western Europe the relatively well-preserved remnants and accumulated knowledge of their own (Greek) civilization, which had mostly not survived the Early Middle Ages in the West. By 1500, the Greek community of Venice numbered about 5,000 members. The community was very active in Venice with the notable members such as Anna Notaras (the daughter of Loukas Notaras, the last megas doux of the Byzantine Empire), Thomas Flanginis (the founder of the Flanginian School) and many others. Additionally, the community founded the confraternity Scuola dei Greci in 1493. The Venetians also ruled Crete, the Ionian Islands and scattered islands and port cities of the former empire, the populations of which were augmented by refugees from other Byzantine provinces who preferred Venetian to Ottoman governance. Crete was especially notable for the Cretan School of icon-painting, where El Greco came from and which after 1453 became the most important in the Greek world.

Nearly all of these Byzantine Greeks fell under Turkish Muslim rule by the 16th century. A notable group were the Phanariots, they emerged as a class of wealthy Greek merchants (of mostly noble Byzantine descent) during the second half of the 16th century, and were influential in the administration of the Ottoman Empire's Balkan domains and the Danubian Principalities in the 18th century. The Phanariots usually built their houses in the Phanar quarter to be near the court of the Patriarch.

Many retained their identities, eventually comprising the modern Greek and Cypriot states, as well as the Cappadocian Greek and Pontic Greek minorities of the new Turkish state. These latter groups, the legacy Byzantine groups of Anatolia, were forced to emigrate from Turkey to Greece in 1923 by the Population exchange between Greece and Turkey. Other Byzantine Greeks, particularly in Anatolia, converted to Islam and underwent Turkification over time. Additionally, those who came under Arab Muslim rule, either fled their former lands or submitted to the new Muslim rulers, receiving the status of Dhimmi. Over the centuries these surviving Christian societies of former Byzantine Greeks in Arab realms evolved into Antiochian Greeks (Melkites) or merged into the societies of Arab Christians, existing to this day.

Many Greek Orthodox populations, particularly those outside the newly independent modern Greek state, continued to refer to themselves as Romioi (i.e. Romans, Byzantines) well into the 20th century. Peter Charanis, who was born on the island of Lemnos in 1908 and later became a professor of Byzantine history at Rutgers University, recounts that when the island was taken from the Ottomans by Greece in 1912, Greek soldiers were sent to each village and stationed themselves in the public squares. Some of the island children ran to see what Greek soldiers looked like. ‘'What are you looking at?’’ one of the soldiers asked. ‘'At Hellenes,’’ the children replied. ‘'Are you not Hellenes yourselves?’’ the soldier retorted. ‘'No, we are Romans,’’ the children replied. The Roman identity also survives prominently in some Greek populations outside of Greece itself. For instance, Greeks in Ukraine, settled there as part of Catherine the Great's Greek Plan in the 18th century, maintain Roman identity, designating themselves as Rumaioi.

See also

Anatolia
Byzantine studies
Decline of the Roman Empire
Greek scholars in the Renaissance
Greek-Turkish relations
Hagia Sophia
Hellenization
History of Greece
History of the Byzantine Empire

Ethnic, religious and political formations

Byzantine Jewry
Romaniote Jews
Ottoman Greeks
Greeks
Roman people

References

Citations

Sources

Further reading

 
Society of the Byzantine Empire
Greeks
Greek culture
Medieval Greece
Medieval ethnic groups of Europe